Rohnert Park Stadium was a stadium in Rohnert Park, California.  It was primarily used for baseball, and was the home field of the Redwood Pioneers and the Sonoma County Crushers minor league baseball teams.  It was built in 1981 and held 4,150 people.  The stadium was torn down in 2005, and the land was redeveloped as a Costco.

References

Sports venues in Sonoma County, California
Minor league baseball venues
Baseball venues in California
Rohnert Park, California
1981 establishments in California
2005 disestablishments in California
Sports venues completed in 1981
Sports venues demolished in 2005
Demolished sports venues in California